The Portjengrat (also known as Pizzo d'Andolla) is a mountain of the Pennine Alps, located on the border between Switzerland and Italy. It lies south of the Weissmies and the Zwischbergen Pass, where the international border diverges away from the main Alpine watershed. The summit of the Portjengrat has an elevation of 3,654 metres above sea level and is the tripoint between the valleys of Saas, Divedro (both in Valais) and Antrona (in Piedmont). It is the culminating point of the Antrona valley.

The east side of the Portjengrat is covered by a glacier named Zwischbergen Gletscher. Smaller glaciers can be found on the west and south side of the mountain.

The closest locality is Saas-Almagell, on the west side.

See also
List of mountains of Switzerland

References

External links
 Portjengrat on Summitpost
 Portjengrat on Hikr

Mountains of the Alps
Alpine three-thousanders
Mountains of Switzerland
Mountains of Piedmont
Italy–Switzerland border
International mountains of Europe
Mountains of Valais